Bolton City Youth Club, also known as Roche-Bois Bolton City, is a Mauritian football club based in Port Louis. They play in the Mauritian League, the top division in Mauritian football.

Stadium
Their home stadium is Stade George V (cap. 6,200), located in Curepipe.

Honours
Trophee de la Jeunesse
winner: 1992

Port-Louis Regional First Division
winner: 2006

National Second Division
winner: 2011

National First Division
winner: 2012

References

External links
Soccerway

Football clubs in Mauritius